Pascoe Vale Road is a major thoroughfare through the northern suburbs of Melbourne, connecting the outer northern fringe to the inner northern suburbs.

Route
Pascoe Vale Road starts at the intersection with Somerton Road in Coolaroo and runs south as a four-lane, dual-carriageway road until the underpass with Camp Road and Johnstone Street in Broadmeadows, where it narrows to a four-lane, single-carriageway road. It continues south over the Western Ring Road through Glenroy, under CityLink and over the Craigieburn railway line through Strathmore, until the intersection with Fletcher Street in Essendon, where it shares surface tram tracks. It continues south to eventually terminate at Moonee Ponds Junction, where it meets Mount Alexander Road and Ascot Vale Road in Moonee Ponds.

Tram route 59 passes along the length of Pascoe Vale Road between Fletcher Street in Essendon and Moonee Ponds Junction.

History
Pascoe Vale Road originally ran north from Mount Alexander Road in Moonee Ponds to Camp Road at Broadmeadows. The Country Roads Board (later VicRoads) declared a northern extension to the existing allocation as a Main Road in the 1959/60 financial year, from Camp Road to the intersection with Somerton Road in Coolaroo. Construction to eliminate the railway crossing at the Broadmeadows railway gates, where Camp Road crossed the Broadmeadows railway line and then Pascoe Vale Road, with a road-over-rail overpass in Broadmeadows, was completed in January 1978.

Pascoe Vale Road was signed as Metropolitan Route 35 between Broadmeadows North and Moonee Ponds in 1965, heading east along Barry Road to eventually meet Hume Highway in Campbellfield. It was extended further north in 1989 along the entire road, heading east along Somerton Road to eventually meet Hume Highway in Coolaroo. Metropolitan Route 35 continues south along Ascot Vale Road eventually to Laverton.

The passing of the Road Management Act 2004 granted the responsibility of overall management and development of Victoria's major arterial roads to VicRoads: in 2004, VicRoads re-declared Pascoe Vale Road (Arterial #5819) from Somerton Road in Coolaroo to Ascot Vale Road in Moonee Ponds.

Major intersections

Gallery

See also

References

Streets in Melbourne
Broadmeadows, Victoria
Transport in the City of Hume
Transport in the City of Merri-bek
Transport in the City of Moonee Valley